Melica schuetzeana is a species of grass in the family Poaceae that is found in Bhutan and in the Chinese provinces Qinghai, Sichuan and Yunnan. It was first described in 1972 by Werner Hempel.

Description
Leaves are cauline; leaf sheaths are purple in colour and are longer than the stem while leaf-blades are  ×  and are stiff with adaxial bottom that is also scaberulous. The glumes are purple in colour with pale green florets that have 2-3 fertile florets. It is also herbaceous, granular-scaberulous and is 5–7-veined.

Ecology
It blooms from July to August.

References

Further reading

schuetzeana
Flora of Asia